Normanton is a civil parish in the metropolitan borough of the City of Wakefield, West Yorkshire, England.  The parish contains 13 listed buildings that are recorded in the National Heritage List for England.  Of these, one is listed at Grade I, the highest of the three grades, one is at Grade II*, the middle grade, and the others are at Grade II, the lowest grade.  The parish contains the town of Normanton and the surrounding area.  The Calder Cut of the Aire and Calder Navigation and the River Calder pass through the parish, and the listed buildings associated with them are an aqueduct, three locks, and two railway viaducts.  The other listed buildings consist of a church, a chest tomb in the churchyard, the stump of a former market cross surmounted by a lamp post, and three houses and an associated structure.


Key

Buildings

References

Citations

Sources

 

Lists of listed buildings in West Yorkshire
Listed